María Murgueytio Velasco (b. 1927 – d. 3 February 2016) was an Ecuadorian politician. She was the first woman in Ecuador to hold a mayoral office. She is also remembered for her work in women's rights in her term as mayor of the city of Riobamba.

Biography
María Murgueytio was the first female graduate from Riobamba's Pedro Vicente Maldonado School and also the first woman to teach history there. She led the feminist movement of Chimborazo Province for women's rights during the era of the military dictatorship of Ecuador.

Her term was characterized by the construction and opening of the  parish, commemoration of Ecuadorian history and nationality via celebration of indigenous peoples, opening of new infrastructure, construction of plumbing to connect rural parishes to sewage facilities and clean water, and the guaranteeing of basic utilities to the people of Riobamba.

Citations

1927 births
2016 deaths
People from Riobamba
Mayors of places in Ecuador
Ecuadorian feminists
Women mayors of places in Ecuador
20th-century Ecuadorian women politicians
20th-century Ecuadorian politicians